Fatima Abou Gahas was a famous female Saudi artist from 'Asir Province.

The style of painting that she is famous for is called "nagash painting", or a fresco wall painting in the majlis, or front parlour, of the traditional Asir home. "Called 'nagash' in Arabic, the wall paintings were a mark of pride for a woman in her house." They are composed of various geometric items and images. Um Abdullah said: “The triangles in the paintings with the little trees are called 'banat' [girls], and she would name a triangle for each of us daughters, like all mothers did. It was fun.” Dr. Sharon Parker, an independent scholar and art historian who has spent decades studying Middle Eastern art, says: “These unusual paintings are linked to the work of other women in the region by virtue of their purpose—to enhance interior spaces—and by the use of geometric patterns to create a narrative reflecting their lives.” 

"Fatima Abou Gahas, armed with brushes made of goat hair, was the only one of these famed majlis painters who lived to paint the walls of a modern home, that of her son-in-law Aam Torshi and her daughter, Salha. Fatima Abou Gahas’s mother, Amna, had also been a well-known painter, but Fatima, who was widowed young and had four little children, actually had to paint for a living. A few years before Fatima died, Aam Torshi asked her to teach her art to several women of different ages. The venue? A workshop in which the women painted the majlis of the modest home where he had been born. He has now made Qasr Bader, as the home is called, a private museum, and he still locks the door with the original key, about the size of his forearm. “She first drew with black paint to make the basic design, although on her own; unlike most, she didn’t need so many guidelines,” he says, noting that charcoal, rather than black paint, was used in the old days. “Then she put a black dot where color needed to go and the other women painted the color in. The women would come at around four p.m. and they would stay until the last call to prayer [in the early evening]. They finished in less than two weeks.”  Normally a majlis takes one to two months to do, depending on the detail. Salha grew up hearing her mother referred to as a “genius.” Sitting in the modern majlis her mother painted, Salha can only say that Fatima Abou Gahas’s creativity “came from God.” “Her designs would just appear to her,” she recalls. “One time she was praying in my home, and afterwards she got up and told me that the prayer rug had given her an idea and she needed to borrow the rug.”

References

Saudi Arabian artists
Saudi Arabian contemporary artists
Saudi Arabian women artists